Seticosta constricta is a species of moth of the family Tortricidae. It is found in Peru.

The wingspan is 22 mm. The ground colour of the forewings is cream suffused with brownish. The hindwings are cream, basally suffused with greyish brown mainly on the periphery.

Etymology
The species name refers to the median constriction of the valva and is derived from Latin constrictio.

References

Moths described in 2010
Seticosta